Peter McDonald Leven (born 27 September 1983) is a Scottish former professional footballer who played as a midfielder. 

A former Scotland international at U21 level, Leven made over 300 career appearances for clubs including Milton Keynes Dons, Kilmarnock, Oxford United and Chesterfield.

Playing career

Rangers
Leven was a youth player with Rangers and as a 16-year-old appeared on the bench four times for the first team, including an Old Firm match. A year later he suffered a serious knee injury in a pre-season game, which ruled him out for two years.

Kilmarnock
Leven signed for Kilmarnock in 2004, he establish himself in the first team. He played 65 times for Kilmarnock and at the end of the 2006–07 season he rejected Kilmarnock's contract offer to head down south.

Chesterfield
Leven joined Chesterfield on a free transfer in 2007. As Aaron Downes made a poor start to the 2007–08 season, Leven was given the captaincy of League Two side Chesterfield. He appeared in 44 of their 49 games in the 2007–08 season. The club turned down numerous offers from Brighton up to £125,000 in the January transfer window. Chesterfield then failed to gain promotion and he turned down a contract extension.

Milton Keynes Dons
Leven joined Milton Keynes Dons in June 2008 on a free transfer.
He won the League 1 Sports Writers Player of the Year for the 2010–11 season, his last for MK Dons. At the end of his contract at the Dons, Leven declined to accept the contract extension the club offered him and left as a free agent.

Oxford United
There was interest in Leven from several clubs, including Millwall and Crystal Palace, but in July 2011 he signed a two-year deal with League Two side Oxford United. Leven set up both Oxford United goals in their 2–1 away win over arch-rivals Swindon on 21 August 2011, their first victory at the County Ground for 38 years. On 29 October 2011 during a home game against Port Vale, with the game at 1–1, Leven intercepted the ball inside his own half and lobbed the opposition keeper from the halfway line, which turned out to be the winning goal and one of the best ever goals scored at the Kassam Stadium.

Retirement
While a free agent, Leven was linked with Paul Ince's Blackpool, but in August 2014 he signed for non-league Jarrow Roofing BCA. Leven retired soon after joining Roofing at the age of 29, having struggled throughout his career with knee problems.

Coaching career
During 2014-15, Leven worked as an academy coach at Middlesbrough. Leven was appointed to a coaching position at Scottish Premier league club Kilmarnock in June 2015 joining the club as Assistant Manager. He left the club on 1 October 2017, when manager Lee McCulloch also departed.

In April 2018, joined Belarusian club Dynamo Brest. Initially employed as head of the academy and B team, he was promoted quickly to first-team assistant manager in August 2018, with an emphasis on overseeing tactics and training under Head Coach Marcel Lička. Brest won the 2019 Belarusian Premier League and 2 super cups, only losing 1 game in 36 matches all season and Qualified for UEFA Champions League football breaking a long period of dominance by BATE Borisov. Leven left the club in March 2020.

After leaving Belarus, Leven took up a coaching position at Russian club FC Orenburg again assisting Lička. Orenburg would gain promotion to the Russian Premier League after winning the relegation play-offs.

Career statistics 
All stats from soccerbase

A.  The "FA Cup" column constitutes appearances (including substitutes) and goals in the FA Cup and Scottish Cup.
B.  The "League Cup" column constitutes appearances (including substitutes) and goals in the Football League Cup and Scottish League Cup.
C.  The "Other" column constitutes appearances (including substitutes) and goals in the Football League Trophy.

Honours 
League One Sports Writers' Player of the Year: 2011
Milton Keynes Dons Football Writers' Player of the Year: 2010–11

References

External links 
Peter Leven player profile at mkdons.com
 

1983 births
Living people
Footballers from Renfrewshire
Scottish footballers
Kilmarnock F.C. players
Rangers F.C. players
Chesterfield F.C. players
Milton Keynes Dons F.C. players
Oxford United F.C. players
Scottish Premier League players
Scotland under-21 international footballers
English Football League players
Jarrow Roofing Boldon Community Association F.C. players
Kilmarnock F.C. non-playing staff
Association football midfielders
Association football coaches
Scottish expatriates in Belarus
Expatriate sportspeople in Belarus